Jesús Gómez Portugal Montenegro (14 May 1941 – 25 November 2017) was a Mexican equestrian and Olympic medalist. He was born in Mexico City. He died on 25 November 2017.

References

External links
Jesús Gómez's profile at Sports Reference.com

1941 births
2017 deaths
Equestrians at the 1980 Summer Olympics
Medalists at the 1980 Summer Olympics
Mexican male equestrians
Olympic equestrians of Mexico
Olympic bronze medalists for Mexico
Olympic medalists in equestrian
Sportspeople from Mexico City
20th-century Mexican people